In the United States, the Series 7 exam, also known as the General Securities Representative Exam (GSRE), is a test for entry-level registered representatives, to buy or sell security products such as corporate securities, municipal securities, options, direct participation programs, investment company products and variable contracts. The Series 7 is administered by Financial Industry Regulatory Authority (FINRA), an industry regulatory agency.

The corequisite is the Securities Industry Essentials (SIE) exam, a change FINRA enacted in 2018. In October 2018, the 250-question Series 7 exam was replaced by the current top-off exam that is now taken in conjunction with the SIE exam. (A correlative change was made to the Series 6 exam.)

Structure 
The Series 7 is a three hour and forty-five minute exam. It is held in one four-hour session. There are 125 questions on the test. Candidates have to score at least 72 percent to pass.  The SIE Exam and the Series 7 Exam are co-requisite exams. 

The Series 7 exam tests candidates on four functions.

In order to take the exam, an individual must be sponsored by a member firm of either FINRA or a self-regulatory organization (SRO).

Registration costs 

As of December 15, 2022, the registration cost is $300.

See also

 List of securities examinations
 Investment Company Products/Variable Life Contracts Representative Exam (Series 6)
 Uniform Securities Agent State Law Examination (Series 63)
 General Securities Principal Exam (Series 24)
 U.S. Securities and Exchange Commission

References

External links 

 Financial Industry Regulatory Authority
 FINRA Registration and Examination Requirements
 Securities Industry Essentials Exam

Professional certification in finance
Standardized tests in the United States
United States securities law